Shakeil Luciano, known professionally as Schak, is a DJ from North Shields, Tyne and Wear, in North East England.

Prior to becoming a DJ, Schak worked as a lifeguard and later for HM Revenue and Customs.

Schak released his debut single "Moving All Around (Jumpin')" on Trick Records in October 2022. The song samples "Bumpin' & Jumpin'" by Kim English. Following the release of the single, Schak has held flash mobs in various locations including a B&Q store, a Tyne and Wear Metro train, the Shields Ferry, on board a bus, and outside of St James Park following a Newcastle United victory. During these events, Schak performed a DJ set.

Schak has been involved in the north east Mákina scene and is behind the character Nanna Makina.

References 

Year of birth missing (living people)
Living people
English DJs
People from North Shields